Claudia Pérez may refer to:

Claudia Pérez (actress) Chilean actress
San Ysidro McDonald's massacre, involved in the massacre